Herman H. Hoffman (April 1, 1844August 12, 1931) was a German American immigrant, farmer, and Republican politician.  He served one term in the Wisconsin State Assembly, representing Portage County.

Biography
Hoffman was born on April 1, 1844, in Görlitz, Prussia. During the American Civil War, he served with the 7th Wisconsin Infantry Regiment of the Union Army. On August 12, 1931, Hoffman died in Amherst, Wisconsin. A resolution was read by the Assembly in his honor following his death.

Political career
Hoffman was a member of the Assembly during the 1895 session. Additionally, he was Supervisor and Chairman (similar to Mayor) of Amherst (town), Wisconsin and Village Supervisor and President (also similar to Mayor) of Amherst Junction, Wisconsin. He was a Republican.

References

External links

Ancestry.com

People from Görlitz
Prussian emigrants to the United States
People from Amherst, Wisconsin
Members of the Wisconsin State Assembly
Mayors of places in Wisconsin
People of Wisconsin in the American Civil War
Union Army soldiers
1844 births
1931 deaths
Burials in Wisconsin